The 1948–49 season was Dinamo București's first season in Divizia A. In this season, Dinamo competed in Liga I, Cupa României and UEFA Europa League. The newly formed team played under the name Dinamo A. Coloman Braun-Bogdan, the former manager of Romania national team, is installed as coach. A group of players is brought, among which Angelo Niculescu, ex-player of FC Craiova and Carmen București, who was to end his career at the end of the season, and Titus Ozon.

Dinamo will conclude on the 8th place with 28 points.

In the same season, the club's second team, Dinamo B, finished first place in the 2nd series of the second division, but had no right to promotion in Divizia A, because it was the second representative from the same town of the same club.

Results

Squad 

Standard team: Petre Ivan (Gheorghe Lăzăreanu) – Florian Ambru, Caius Novac (Cornel Simionescu) – Dumitru Ignat, Angelo Niculescu (Gheorghe Teodorescu), Ion Șiclovan – Iuliu Farkaș, Titus Ozon, Carol Bartha (Marin Apostol), Jack Moisescu, Vasile Naciu (Alexandru Petculescu).

References 
 www.labtof.ro

1948-49
Association football clubs 1948–49 season
1948–49 in Romanian football